Father Jean-Paul de Rome d'Ardène (25 January 1690 – 5 December 1769) in domaine d'Ardène in Saint-Michel (modern Saint-Michel-l'Observatoire, Alpes-de-Haute-Provence) was an 18th-century French botanist.

Origins 
Jean-Paul de Rome d'Ardène was the son of Honoré de Rome sieur d’Ardène, commissaire des galères et inspecteur des bois et forêts de Provence who had the Château d’Ardène built in 1686 and Antoinette Leroy, daughter of Jean Leroy, conseiller du Roi et contrôleur général de la marine du Levant et des galères de France. His elder brother, Esprit-Jean de Rome d'Ardène (1684-1748) was a well known writer and fabulist.

Life 
An adolescent, Jean-Paul de Rome d'Ardène studied rhetoric and philosophy at the Marseille College, then was admitted to the Oratory of Aix en Provence in 1708. In Arles he studied theology before teaching humanities in Marseille. Frail, he was quickly relieved of his duties and in 1714, was allowed to retire and return to live on the lands of his family, in Ardène. Always a member of the Oratory of Aix while remaining in Ardène, he was ordained priest in 1718. He then devoted himself to botany and would write many books on growing flowers (Traité des renoncules (1746), Traité des jacinthes (1759), ...) which would experience great success with his contemporaries. In addition, making his entourage benefit of his knowledge of medicinal plants and passionate about their study, he published the Lettres sur l’exercice de la médecine in 1759.

Works 
 
1759: Lettres sur l’exercice de la médecine
1759: Traité des jacinthes
 
1762: Traité des œillets
1767: Abrégés de jardinage
1767: Œuvres posthumes de Monsieur d'Ardene, associé a l'académie des Belles-Lettres de Marseille: œuvres posthumes d'Esprit-Jean de Rome d'Ardène, collected, compiled and published by his brother.
1769: l’Année Champêtre.

References

Bibliography 
 Jacques Billoud, Un agronome provençal du XVIIIe siècle : le Père Rome d'Ardène, (p. 331-340), in Provence historique, fascicule 54, tome 13, 1963 read online
 Charles Bourgeois, Le Père J.-P. de Rome d'Ardène, botaniste et agronome provençal (1690-1769). I, La vie, (p. 463-472), in  Revue d'histoire de la pharmacie, 1969, Volume 57, n°203 read online
 Charles Bourgeois, Le Père J.-P. de Rome d'Ardène, botaniste et agronome provençal (1690-1769) (suite). II. L'œuvre, (p. 21-38), dans  Revue d'histoire de la pharmacie, 1970, Volume 58, n°204 read online

External links 
 Jean-Paul de Rome d'Ardène on Data.bnf.fr
 Gonzague de Rey, Recherches sur l'hospitalité de Notre-Dame d'Ardène et ses juspatrons, 1869 sur sorbonne.fr (cf. III. La Famille de Rome, p. 50).

18th-century French botanists
18th-century French writers
18th-century French male writers
People from Provence
1690 births
1769 deaths